George M. Borg (December 4, 1934 – September 7, 1971) was a Republican member of the Wisconsin State Assembly and the Wisconsin State Senate.

Background 
Borg was born in Colorado Springs, Colorado. He was an heir to the Borg-Warner fortune. His grandfather, Swedish immigrant Charles W. Borg (1861–1946), had co-founded Borg-Warner.  He moved to Wisconsin in 1935 and attended the University of Wisconsin–Madison. He subsequently served in the United States Army.

Legislative career 
Borg became an alderman in Delavan, Wisconsin. He served three terms in the Assembly before challenging three-term incumbent Peter P. Carr for the Republican Senate nomination in 1966 after the district was changed by a redistricting. He unseated Carr in a three-way primary election race, and won the general election in a district of which the Milwaukee Journal said, "Democrats are as scarce as palm trees"; but resigned from the Senate on August 9, 1967. He had been reported as planning to challenge Democrat Lynn E. Stalbaum for his Congress seat; instead, the seat was reclaimed by Henry C. Schadeberg, whom Stalbaum had defeated two years earlier.

Death 
Borg died in 1971 as a result of injuries sustained in a motorcycle accident in Lake Geneva, Wisconsin. He had three children Erik, Tamara, and Karl.

References

1934 births
1971 deaths
Military personnel from Wisconsin
Republican Party members of the Wisconsin State Assembly
People from Delavan, Wisconsin
Politicians from Colorado Springs, Colorado
Road incident deaths in Wisconsin
United States Army soldiers
Wisconsin city council members
Republican Party Wisconsin state senators
University of Wisconsin–Madison alumni
American people of Swedish descent
BorgWarner
20th-century American politicians
Motorcycle road incident deaths